Polyspina piosae, commonly known as the orangebarred puffer, is a species of pufferfish endemic to the coast of western Australia.  This species is the only known member of its genus.

References
 

Tetraodontidae
Taxa named by Gilbert Percy Whitley
Fish described in 1955